The Sunflower Formation is a geologic formation in Nevada. It preserves fossils dating back to the Permian period.

See also

 List of fossiliferous stratigraphic units in Nevada
 Paleontology in Nevada

References

External links

Permian geology of Nevada